The 12th Washington D.C. Area Film Critics Association Awards were announced on December 8, 2013.

Winners and nominees
Best Film
 12 Years a Slave
 American Hustle
 Gravity
 Her
 Inside Llewyn Davis

Best Director
 Alfonso Cuarón – Gravity
 Spike Jonze – Her
 Baz Luhrmann – The Great Gatsby
 Steve McQueen – 12 Years a Slave
 Martin Scorsese – The Wolf of Wall Street

Best Actor
 Chiwetel Ejiofor – 12 Years a Slave
 Leonardo DiCaprio – The Wolf of Wall Street
 Matthew McConaughey – Dallas Buyers Club
 Joaquin Phoenix – Her
 Robert Redford – All Is Lost

Best Actress
 Cate Blanchett – Blue Jasmine
 Sandra Bullock – Gravity
 Judi Dench – Philomena
 Meryl Streep – August: Osage County
 Emma Thompson – Saving Mr. Banks

Best Supporting Actor
 Jared Leto – Dallas Buyers Club
 Daniel Brühl – Rush
 Michael Fassbender – 12 Years a Slave
 James Franco – Spring Breakers
 James Gandolfini – Enough Said

Best Supporting Actress
 Lupita Nyong'o – 12 Years a Slave
 Scarlett Johansson – Her
 Jennifer Lawrence – American Hustle
 Octavia Spencer – Fruitvale Station
 June Squibb – Nebraska

Best Adapted Screenplay
 12 Years a Slave – John Ridley Before Midnight – Julie Delpy, Ethan Hawke, and Richard Linklater
 Captain Phillips – Billy Ray
 The Spectacular Now – Michael H. Weber and Scott Neustadter
 The Wolf of Wall Street – Terence WinterBest Original Screenplay Her – Spike Jonze American Hustle – Eric Warren Singer and David O. Russell
 Blue Jasmine – Woody Allen
 Enough Said – Nicole Holofcener
 Inside Llewyn Davis – Joel Coen and Ethan CoenBest Ensemble 12 Years a Slave
 American Hustle
 August: Osage County
 Prisoners
 The Way Way Back

Best Animated Film
 Frozen
Turbo
 Despicable Me 2
 Monsters University
 The Wind Rises

Best Documentary Film
 Blackfish
 20 Feet from Stardom
 The Act of Killing
 Leviathan
 Stories We Tell

Best Foreign Language Film
 The Broken Circle Breakdown • Belgium
 Blue Is the Warmest Colour • France
 The Hunt • Denmark
 The Past • France/Iran
 Wadjda • Saudi Arabia/Germany

Best Art Direction
 The Great Gatsby
 12 Years a Slave
 Gravity
 Her
 Inside Llewyn Davis

Best Cinematography
 Gravity
 12 Years a Slave
 The Great Gatsby
 Her
 Inside Llewyn Davis

Best Editing
 Gravity
 12 Years a Slave
 Her
 Rush
 The Wolf of Wall Street

Best Score
 12 Years a Slave – Hans Zimmer Frozen – Christophe Beck
 Gravity – Steven Price
 Her – Arcade Fire
 Saving Mr. Banks – Thomas NewmanBest Youth Performance Tye Sheridan – Mud
 Asa Butterfield – Ender's Game
 Adèle Exarchopoulos – Blue Is the Warmest Colour
 Liam James – The Way Way Back
 Waad Mohammed – Wadjda

The Joe Barber Award for Best Portrayal of Washington, D.C.
 The Butler
 The East
 Olympus Has Fallen
 Philomena
 White House Down

Multiple nominations and awards

These films had multiple nominations:

 11 nominations: 12 Years a Slave
 9 nominations: Her
 7 nominations: Gravity
 4 nominations: American Hustle, Inside Llewyn Davis, and The Wolf of Wall Street
 3 nominations: The Great Gatsby
 2 nominations: August: Osage County, Blue Jasmine, Blue Is the Warmest Colour, Dallas Buyers Club, Enough Said, Frozen, Philomena, Rush, Saving Mr. Banks, Wadjda, and The Way Way Back

The following films received multiple awards:

 6 wins: 12 Years a Slave
 3 wins: Gravity

References

External links
 The Washington D.C. Area Film Critics Association

2013
2013 film awards